The following events occurred in February 1925:

February 1, 1925 (Sunday)
The final leg of the serum run to Nome began as the team of Gunnar Kaasen and lead dog Balto set out from Bluff at 10:00 p.m. into a blizzard.
Ahmed Zog ascended to power in Albania, becoming its President, Prime Minister and Marshal of the Royal Albanian Army.
Irish President W. T. Cosgrave appealed to the United States for food aid. Ireland's potato crop had been severely curtailed by heavy rainfall the previous summer and autumn.
Miguel Paz Barahona takes office as President of Honduras.
Herma Szabo of Austria won the Ladies Competition of the World Figure Skating Championships in Davos, Switzerland.
Born: Mary Nesbitt Wisham, baseball player, in Greenville, South Carolina (d. 2013)

February 2, 1925 (Monday)
The serum run ended successfully as the team of Gunnar Kaasen and lead dog Balto arrived in Nome at 5:30 a.m.
U.S. President Calvin Coolidge signed into law an air mail bill popularly known as the Kelly Air Mail Act, which relieved the government of the responsibility for air mail.
The fantasy adventure film The Lost World was released.
Born: Elaine Stritch, actress and singer, in Detroit (d. 2014)
Died: Jaap Eden, 51, Dutch speed skater

February 3, 1925 (Tuesday)
The discovery of the Taung Child fossilized skull in South Africa the previous November was first publicized.
The Bulgarian bank Girdap declared bankruptcy.
Born: John Fiedler, actor, in Platteville, Wisconsin (d. 2005); Leon Schlumpf, politician, in Felsberg, Switzerland (d. 2012)
Died: Oliver Heaviside, 74, English mathematician

February 4, 1925 (Wednesday)
Nels Nelsen set a new world record for ski jumping with a leap of 240 feet (73.152 metres) in Revelstoke, British Columbia. He was said to be sick with the flu when he made the jump.
The tunnel that was being used to reach trapped cave explorer Floyd Collins collapsed, requiring a new tunnel to be dug.
Died: Robert Koldewey, 69, German architect and archaeologist

February 5, 1925 (Thursday)
10 people were arrested in the Soviet Union for conspiring to assassinate Grigory Zinoviev. 
Diplomatic relations between Chile and Romania were established.

February 6, 1925 (Friday)
Prime Minister Chandra Shamsher Jang Bahadur Rana of Nepal announced his intention to abolish slavery in the country.
Former German Chancellor Gustav Bauer resigned his Reichstag seat in disgrace over the Barmat corruption scandal.

February 7, 1925 (Saturday)
Boxing champion Jack Dempsey and Hollywood film actress Estelle Taylor were married in a small ceremony in San Diego.
Born: Hans Schmidt, professional wrestler, in Joliette, Quebec, Canada (d. 2012)

February 8, 1925 (Sunday)
The Sheikh Said rebellion broke out in southeastern Turkey.
Parliamentary elections were held in the Kingdom of Serbs, Croats and Slovenes. The People's Radical Party remained the largest faction in Parliament.
Born: Jack Lemmon, actor, in Newton, Massachusetts (d. 2001)

February 9, 1925 (Monday)
Germany presented a conciliatory memorandum to France proposing a mutual guarantee of the existing border between the two countries.
The comedy play Loggerheads featuring Whitford Kane opened in New York City.
Born: Vic Wertz, baseball player, in York, Pennsylvania (d. 1983)

February 10, 1925 (Tuesday)
The U.S.-Canadian Fishing Agreement was signed, outlining fishing rights for the respective countries.
Born: Pierre Mondy, actor and director, in Neuilly-sur-Seine, Paris, France (d. 2012)
Died: Aristide Bruant, 73, French cabaret singer and nightclub owner

February 11, 1925 (Wednesday)
138 German miners were killed when the Stein mine in Dortmund exploded.
In the English House of Commons, Reginald Applin of the Conservatives asked the Speaker of the House if Labour MP Ellen Wilkinson was in order while addressing the House without wearing a hat. The Speaker ruled that she was and a precedent for women was set.
Born: Virginia E. Johnson, sexologist, in Springfield, Missouri (d. 2013); Kim Stanley, actress, in Tularosa, New Mexico (d. 2001)
Died: H. E. Beunke, 73, Dutch writer

February 12, 1925 (Thursday)
Thousands of miners around Dortmund stopped work as both a sympathy gesture for the victims of the Stein mine explosion and a protest against dangerous mining conditions.
U.S. President Calvin Coolidge signed the Federal Arbitration Act into law.
Born: Lev Naumov, classical pianist and composer, in Rostov, USSR (d. 2005)

February 13, 1925 (Friday)
The Judiciary Act of 1925, also known as the Judge's Bill, was passed as an effort to reduce the workload of the Supreme Court of the United States.
Floyd Collins dies after being stuck in Sand Cave for over a week.

February 14, 1925 (Saturday)
Paavo Nurmi ran another record-breaking race in Madison Square Garden by running two miles in 8 minutes 58.2 seconds.
Died: Arnold W. Brunner, 67, American architect

February 15, 1925 (Sunday)
The Walt Disney animated film short Alice Solves the Puzzle was released, introducing the character known as Pete.
Vitorino Guimarães became Prime Minister of Portugal.
Willy Böckl of Austria won the Men's Competition of the World Figure Skating Championships in Vienna.
The London Zoo announced it would install lights to cheer up the animals during London's foggy spells.
Died: Duke Farrell, 58, American baseball player

February 16, 1925 (Monday)
Rescue diggers in Sand Cave, Kentucky reached Floyd Collins at 2:45 in the afternoon and found him dead.
Bavaria lifted the ban on the Nazi Party that was imposed after the Beer Hall Putsch.
Born: Ed Emshwiller, visual artist, in Lansing, Michigan (d. 1990); Evelyn G. Lowery, civil rights activist, in Memphis, Tennessee (d. 2013)

February 17, 1925 (Tuesday)
Ex-Prime Minister of the United Kingdom H.H. Asquith took his seat in the House of Lords as the Earl of Oxford and Asquith.
Born: Ron Goodwin, composer and conductor, in Plymouth, England (d. 2003); Hal Holbrook, actor, in Cleveland, Ohio (d. 2021)

February 18, 1925 (Wednesday)
U.S. President Calvin Coolidge suggested that an international conference be held to set limits on the size of naval vessels.
New Zealand's rugby union team defeated the visiting Canadian team from Victoria, British Columbia, 68 to 4, in Toulouse, France to complete a perfect 32–0 record in their 1924–25 tour of Britain, Ireland and France. New Zealand scored a total of 838 points with only 116 points scored against them.
In a cricket match played in Melbourne, the English team defeated Australia in the 4th Test for their first win against the Australians since 1912.
Born: George Kennedy, actor, in New York City (d. 2016)
Died: James Lane Allen, 75, American writer

February 19, 1925 (Thursday)
A revised International Opium Convention was signed in Geneva.
Karakalpak Autonomous Oblast was created.
Born: Jindřich Feld, composer, in Prague, Czechoslovakia (d. 2007)

February 20, 1925 (Friday)
A mine explosion in Sullivan, Indiana killed 51.
Born: Robert Altman, filmmaker, in Kansas City, Missouri (d. 2006)

February 21, 1925 (Saturday)
Bulgarian Prime Minister Aleksandar Tsankov declared a state of war throughout the country amid fighting between Bulgarian and Serbian irregulars attributed to communist agitators.
This is the cover date of the very first issue of The New Yorker, though not necessarily the publication date, as magazines usually date their covers ahead of time.
A dynamite depot in Brazil exploded, killing 621.
Born: Sam Peckinpah, film director and screenwriter, in Fresno, California (d. 1984)

February 22, 1925 (Sunday)
The Chamber of Deputies in France voted against keeping a French embassy in the Vatican.
The Polish Ice Hockey Federation was founded.
Born: Maddy English, baseball player, in Everett, Massachusetts (d. 2004)

February 23, 1925 (Monday)
The film Lady of the Night, starring Norma Shearer, was released.
Died: Samuel Berger, 50, Olympic gold medalist boxer

February 24, 1925 (Tuesday)
The United States and Canada signed the Lake of the Woods Treaties, defining the lake's boundary line more accurately, regulating its water level, and arranging for the settlement of port damages caused by overflowing that arose from work done on the Canadian side.
Born: Lynn Chandnois, American football player, in Fayette, Michigan (d. 2011)
Died: Hjalmar Branting, 64, Prime Minister of Sweden and recipient of the Nobel Peace Prize

February 25, 1925 (Wednesday)
The Guna Revolution broke out in Panama when chiefs Nele Kantule and Ologintipipilele led attacks on police on the islands of Tupile and Ukupseni.
Born: Shehu Shagari, 6th President of Nigeria, in Shagari (d. 2018)
Died: Louis Feuillade, 52, French film director; Joseph M. McCormick, 47, American businessman and politician (suicide)

February 26, 1925 (Thursday)
A major Wahhabi raid was carried out across the border of Transjordan.
Born: Everton Weekes, cricketer, in Saint Michael, Barbados (d. 2020)

February 27, 1925 (Friday)
The legally reinstated Nazi Party held a convention in the same hall in Munich where Adolf Hitler had launched his failed putsch. Hitler made his first speech since his release from prison to a packed audience of over 4,000 in the hall as another 1,000 stood outside.
Born: Samuel Dash, professor of law and chief counsel for the Senate Watergate Committee, in Camden, New Jersey (d. 2004)

February 28, 1925 (Saturday)
The Charlevoix–Kamouraska earthquake struck northeastern North America.
Died: Friedrich Ebert, 54, President of Germany

References

1925
1925-02
1925-02